Caner Osman (born 12 July 1991) is a Turkish-Macedonian coach and former professional basketball player. He is currently assistant coach of Aleksandar Trifunović in Yeşilgiresun Belediye. He last played for KK Kumanovo  which competes in the Macedonian First League .

Personal life
Osman was born in Ohrid, SFR Yugoslavia (modern-day North Macedonia) to a Turkish father and Bosniak mother (from Novi Pazar, Serbia). His brother, Cedi Osman, is also a professional basketball player.

References

1988 births
Living people
Macedonian men's basketball players
Macedonian people of Turkish descent
Macedonian people of Bosnia and Herzegovina descent
Sportspeople from Ohrid
Anadolu Efes S.K. players
KK Bosna Royal players
Erdemirspor players
Small forwards